is a Japanese fashion model, TV personality, and actor represented by the Ever Green Entertainment agency. He appears on Japanese TV, playing on his "overly negative" character, and debuted as a film actor in the 2013 film Zekkyō Gakkyū.

Early life
Louis Kurihara was born on 6 December 1994 to a Japanese mother and a British father.

Career
On 1 July 2013, Kurihara left the Junes Acting & Modeling agency to work for Ever Green Entertainment and devote more time to his acting career.

Film
 Zekkyō Gakkyū (2013) as Akira Gotō
 Daily Lives of High School Boys (2013), as Saino
 Black Butler (2014)
 Boku wa Tomodachi ga Sukunai (2014)
 108: Revenge and Adventure of Goro Kaiba (2019) as Michio
 Signal 100 (2020)
 Tonkatsu DJ Agetarō (2020) as Jōsuke Shirai
 Daughter of Lupin the Movie (2021)
 Prisoners of the Ghostland (2021)

TV
 Odoru Sanma Goten! (NTV)
 Osama no Brunch (TBS)
 Waratte Iitomo! (Fuji TV, regular Wednesday guest since October 2012)
 Mōsō Nihon Ryōri (NHK, presenter)
 Magical x Heroine MagiMajo Pures! (TV Tokyo)
Daughter of Lupin (Fuji TV, 2019–20)

Magazines
 Fineboys
 Men's Non-No
 Popeye
 Street Jack

TV commercials
 Aeon Laketown shopping mall
 JR Central
 Nisshin Cup Noodle

Photobooks

References

External links
 Talent Databank profile 
 Official blog 
 Twitter 
 Facebook 
 

Japanese male models
Japanese television personalities
1994 births
Japanese people of British descent
Living people
21st-century Japanese male actors
Models from Tokyo Metropolis